

Films

Die Kirche bleibt im Dorf 

(translated: The church remains in the village) is a 2012 German comedy film directed by Ulrike Grote.

Cast 
 Natalia Wörner as Maria Häberle
 Karoline Eichhorn as Christine Häberle
 Julia Nachtmann as Klara Häberle
 Christian Pätzold as Gottfried Häberle
 Elisabeth Schwarz as Elisabeth Rossbauer
 Stephan Schad as Karl Rossbauer
 Hans Löw as Peter Rossbauer
 Gary Francis Smith as Howard Jones 
 Peter Jordan as Dieter Osterloh
 Dietz Werner Steck as Harald Löffler
 Rolf Schübel as Rolf Merz
 Ulrich Gebauer as Schäuble
 Dominik Kuhn as Jürgen Bauer

Täterätää! – Die Kirche bleibt im Dorf 2 

The sequel to the first film was released in 2015 in cinemas and was first broadcast on ARD on 7 September 2019.

Cast 
 Natalia Wörner: Maria Häberle
 Stephan Schad: Karl Rossbauer
 Karoline Eichhorn: Christine Häberle
 Gary Francis Smith: Howard Jones
 Julia Nachtmann: Klara Häberle
 Hans Löw: Peter Rossbauer
 Franziska Küpferle: Elisabeth Rossbauer
 Christian Pätzold: Gottfried Häberle
 Ulrich Gebauer: Pfarrer Schäuble
 Sabine Hahn: Tante Ruth
 Rainer Piwek: Hinnark Krüger
 Meike Kircher: Sabine Windelband
 Joachim Raaf: Georg Brüderle
 Frank Stöckle: Walter Dengler
 Rolf Schübel: Rolf Merz
 Jasper Diedrichsen: Rezeptionist Detlef

Series 
There is also a series from 2013 with the same name. 

It tells the prequel to the first film.
It is directed by Ulrike Grote, who is also responsible for the script of the Swabian dialect comedy, and Rolf Schübel. The first broadcast of the television series began on 15 April 2013 on SWR television.

The second season started on 8 December 2014, the third season on 19 October 2015. The first season consists of 12 episodes, the following three seasons six each.

Episodelist

Season 1

Season 2

Season 3

Season 4

External links 

2012 comedy films
2012 films
German comedy films
2010s German films

 Die Kirche bleibt im Dorf 2 

 Serie